Boubacar Coly (born July 11, 1983) is a Senegalese former professional basketball player.

Collegiate career 
Coly played his first two seasons of college basketball with Xavier, drawing comparisons with former Musketeer Romain Sato, and transferred to Morgan State Bears for his junior and senior years. In 2008, he was named first-team All-Mid-Eastern Athletic Conference (MEAC) and league defensive player of the year.

Professional career 
In June 2008, Coly participated in an ACMT EuroExposure camp in Ohio in the United States. In April 2009, he signed with Al Ansar of the Saudi Premier League. He helped the team win the Nukhba Cup. In November of the same year, Coly signed a contract with the Hamamatsu Higashimikawa Phoenix of the bj League in Japan. After playing a total of five games and averaging 1.6 points and 2.8 rebounds, he was released. In December 2010, Coly signed with GIE Morrow Disciples of the Universal Basketball Association (UBA) in the United States and left in January 2011. He then joined the Moncton Miracles for the inaugural 2011–12 National Basketball League of Canada season. Coly was named to the NBL Canada All-Defensive Second Team by the end of the season.

International career 
Coly has played for the Senegal national basketball team at the AfroBasket on multiple occasions. He averaged 1.2 points and 3.0 rebounds in 2009 and 5.5 points and 4.0 rebounds in 2011.

External links 
Agency profile
Boubacar Coly at RealGM
Boubacar Coly at Asia-Basket.com
FIBA.com profile

References 

1983 births
Living people
Centers (basketball)
Morgan State Bears men's basketball players
San-en NeoPhoenix players
Senegalese expatriate basketball people in Canada
Senegalese expatriate basketball people in Japan
Senegalese expatriate basketball people in Saudi Arabia
Senegalese expatriate basketball people in the United States
Senegalese men's basketball players
Xavier Musketeers men's basketball players